The Adventures of the Scarlet Pimpernel is a British television series based on the 1905 adventure novel of the same name by Baroness Emmuska Orczy. The series was created by writer Michael Hogan and produced by the Towers of London for Incorporated Television Programmes. It was first screened in Britain in 1955 to 1956 in an eighteen-episode run beginning on 28 September 1955. It was one of the first drama series shown on the fledging network, which had only begun transmission in London the week before.

Cast and characters
Marius Goring as Sir Percy Blakeney/The Scarlet Pimpernel
Stanley Van Beers as Chauvelin
Patrick Troughton as Sir Andrew Ffoulkes
Anthony Newlands as Lord Richard Hastings
Alexander Gauge as George, Prince of Wales
Lucie Mannheim as Countess la Valliere

Production notes
Lucie Mannheim was married to Marius Goring
Filming was at Elstree Studios, London
The series' sets were designed by the art director Duncan Sutherland.
Marius Goring previously played the role of Sir Percy in a radio show which lasted from 1952 to 1953 in a total of 50 episodes. The series is now available to listen to for free on the Internet Archive.
It was originally planned to produce 39 episodes but only 18 were eventually filmed and broadcast.

Guest stars
Many guest stars appeared in other ITC series, BBC series and films:
Ivor Dean
Roger Delgado
William Franklyn
Conrad Phillips
Robert Shaw
Peter O'Toole
Rachel Gurney
Thea Gregory
Maureen Connell
Walter Rilla
Phil Brown
Brian Wilde

Episode list
Dates are for the first broadcast on Independent Television in London (Associated-Rediffusion), Midlands and Northern.

Home media
Alpha Home Entertainment released Volume 1 of The Adventures of the Scarlet Pimpernel on DVD in 2006.  Volume 2 was released in 2007.  Each volume contains four episodes from the television series. The cover art used on these releases, however, erroneously used photos of Marius Goring in his character as Conductor 71 from his 1946 film A Matter of Life and Death.

Network (UK) released the entire 18-episode series on a three disc DVD set on 30 July 2012 with some extras included: a behind the scenes photo gallery.

References

External links

Costume sketches by Motley Theatre Design Group – Motley Collection of Theatre & Costume Design

1950s British drama television series
1955 British television series debuts
1956 British television series endings
Television series by ITC Entertainment
ITV television dramas
Television series set in the French Revolution
British adventure television series
Black-and-white British television shows
English-language television shows
Films based on works by Emma Orczy
Television shows shot at Associated British Studios